Permatang Pauh is a federal constituency in Central Seberang Perai District, Penang, Malaysia, that has been represented in the Dewan Rakyat since 1974.

The federal constituency was created from parts of the Seberang Tengah constituency in the 1974 redistribution and is mandated to return a single member to the Dewan Rakyat under the first past the post voting system.

The seat has been well known for being the seat held by Anwar Ibrahim's family since 1982, until Nurul Izzah unexpectedly lost the seat to Perikatan Nasional in the 2022 election.

Demographics 
https://live.chinapress.com.my/ge15/parliament/PENANG

History

Polling districts 
According to the federal gazette issued on 31 October 2022, the Permatang Pauh constituency is divided into 28 polling districts.

Representation history

State constituency

Current state assembly members

Local governments

Election results

References

Penang federal constituencies